The Präsident was an automobile manufactured by Nesselsdorfer Wagenbau-Fabriks-Gesellschaft A.G. (Nesselsdorf or NW, now known as Tatra) in 1897. It was the first actually drivable factory made petrol-engined automobile produced in Austria-Hungary as well as in Central and Eastern Europe (save the attempt of Siegfried Marcus of Vienna to build a self-propelled car in 1875). It was constructed by Leopold Sviták and Hans Ledwinka. The automobile was more of a carriage without horses than a car in modern sense. The car is steered via handlebars (while most of the cars of the era had a tiller). The wooden bodywork is placed on an iron frame. It has four seats and a convertible top that would cover only the rear seats. Both axles have suspension of semi-elliptical leaf springs. The wheels were similar to the ones of a horse carriage, but had rubber tyres. The car had a two cylinder spark ignition Benz engine placed by the rear axle.

History
Ignác Šustala, a skilled joiner, started to manufacture horse carriages at his own farm. In 1853 he borrowed some money and established a small manufacturing business. Initially the horse carriages were made there, but soon it started manufacturing also rail wagons. Shortly before his death Ignác Šustala established a joint stock company Nesselsdorfer Wagenfabrik.

The company's director Hugo Fischer bought from Karl Benz one Benz Phaeton automobile as well as a latest Benz engine; this was instigated by Baron Theodor Liebig of Liberec, whose  drive of 1894 around Europe without any major difficulties brought fame to the Benz Viktoria and Benz's gratitude. The Phaeton was used as a model for construction of the factory's first car in 1897, however it isn't the Phaeton's copy, whole new conception was applied. Leopold Sviták, the factory's foreman, was head of the construction works. The automobile was named the Präsident; the construction was finished in May 1898.

Design
The car had a two cylinder four stroke spark ignition Benz engine. It had two speed transmission which was propelling the rear axle via flat strap.

The bodywork was derived from a horse carriage of Mylord type. At the time NW was renowned in the monarchy for its luxurious carriages, and the automobile itself was made in according fashion.

It seated four, the two rear seats could be covered by a convertible top. The car was steered by handlebars. Tilting of the handlebars forward and backward served to change gears (forward - lower gear). The wheels were wooden with gum tyre.

After a number of test drives the first automobile was finished, it drove from Kopřivnice to Vienna to take part in the Franz Josef jubilee exhibition. The drivers were Hugo Fischer and Baron Theodor Liebig. After the exhibition the car was donated to the Austrian autoclub in Vienna.

The unique features of the car were a differential and functional bumper.

Präsident today

Original
The very first car is now in Czech National Technical Museum and is still driveable. Unfortunately, before it was handed to the Museum in 1918, it was used in Austria to train drivers and it underwent some modifications, which infringed the original design (including engine swap). The engine which is now in the Präsident is probably the first one made in Kopřivnice, after the manufacture of engines started in 1900.

Replica
A group of enthusiasts from the Tatra factory made an exact replica of the 1897 original state Präsident in 1977, which is now to be seen in the Tatra factory museum in Kopřivnice.

There were a few reasons why the replica was built. First of all, the company wanted to have the Präsident for the jubilee celebrations, and secondly the original underwent modifications of engine, accessory, lights, the convertible top as well as of the colour livery, and thus it couldn't represent the factory's very first car. The work on replica started in March 1974 and were scheduled to be finished on 1 May 1977.

60 original papers of design documentation survived, however another 1150 had to be made, for which purposes the original Präsident was used. The manufacture took place in Tatra factory and was conducted by its engineers as well as retired workers of technical department.

The engine was manufactured also by Tatra. Four of them were made - one for the "new" Präsident, one for the National Technical Museum, where it is on exposition near the original Präsident (which has a larger engine than it was made with), and the two other were made to be joined as a four-cylinder used in a replica of the First Truck. The replica is driveable and is on display in Tatra factory museum.

Legacy
The initial cars from Kopřivnice, which were made individually, followed production of Präsident and were derived from it. They were named Meteor, Nesselsdorf, Wien. Bergsteiger, Versucher, Adhof, Spitzbub, Balder and Metrans. They differed in design details; belt drive was replaced by a four speed gear-box with spur gears. A cable drive was used before the gearbox, but it was not successful.

In 1899, the NW-cars Wien and Nesselsdorf, achieved their first significant racing success on the trotter course at the Prater Park in Vienna. It was the first race in Austrian monarchy at all – started on October 23, 1899. The driver of the winning NW-car Wien was baron Theodor von Liebig. The other NW-car Nesselsdorf was the second one before all concurente of four Benz-cars and four Dietrich-Bolleé cars. Liebig won also other races later, which led to manufacture of first true race car made by NW - the Rennzweier.

For later models the alphabets were used (A, B, S, T, U ...), and since about 1921 as the company changed name to Tatra, it uses numbers to name the models (11, 12, 20...). One year after the manufacture of Präsident, the First Truck was built. The manufacture of cars continued in Kopřivnice till 1998 with the last car Tatra T700. The manufacture of heavy duty trucks continues up to today.

Even today's models (i.e. Tatra 815) follow the unique design features (such as backbone tube with swinging half-axles) which were introduced by Hans Ledwinka in 1920s, who himself took part in construction of the Präsident. Throughout the time, Tatra introduced to the automotive world revolutionary concepts such as modern car aerodynamics through model Tatra T77, as well as design of a "peoples car" through Tatra V570 and Tatra T97. However, 40 years of planned economy in Czechoslovakia made the company to specialize in heavy off-road trucks while the manufacture of cars was only subsidiary. The turmoil years after the Velvet revolution brought Tatra to the edge of bankruptcy and consequently the manufacture of cars was abandoned, while only the production of heavy-duty trucks continues.

See also 
 VinFast President

References

External links

 Tatra portal - Web site about TATRA cars and trucks - Magazine articles about Präsident (Czech, Slovak)
 Video of Präsident and other Tatras driving through the streets of Prague in 1936

Cars of the Czech Republic
Tatra vehicles
Rear-wheel-drive vehicles
Rear-engined vehicles
Cars powered by boxer engines
Tatra Prasident
Tatra Prasident
Cars introduced in 1897